Where the Sun Never Sets is the fourth and final studio album by A Global Threat. It was released in 2006 on BYO Records. It is the most musically innovative of all their albums, moving even farther from the street punk sound of their first two.

Track listing

Lineup for recording 
 Bryan Lothian - vocals and guitar
 John Curran - bass and vocals
 Mike Graves - drums guitar

Additional personnel 
 AGT Choir - additional vocals
 Arya Zahedi - vocals on track 3
 Mark Civitarese - vocals on track 5 and 14
 Brian Riley - vocals on track 8
 Nick Cahalane - vocals on track 12
 Phil Goldenberg - guitar on track 13
 Mike Kadomiya, Dug Moore - vocals on track 15

Engineered by Richard Marr
Mixed and produced by Richard and A Global Threat
Mastered by Jeff Lipton

A Global Threat albums
2006 albums
BYO Records albums